The Bulgarian National Television (Bulgarian: Българска национална телевизия, Balgarska natsionalna televizia) or BNT (БНТ), stylized as ·Б·Н·Т· since 2018, is a public television broadcaster of Bulgaria. BNT was founded in 1959 and started broadcasting on December 26 of the same year. It was the first television service to broadcast on the territory of Bulgaria.

BNT is a member of International Radio and Television Organisation (to 31 December 1992), European Broadcasting Union (from 1 January 1993), EGTA, IMZ, CIRCOM Regional, FIAT and BBLF.

History
The first broadcast of the first Bulgarian television was in 1959. The archive had recorders, photos and movies which were for the public in the end of the 1950s and beginning of 1960s. Since 1964 BNT began broadcasting news, programmes and movies in monochrome to serve the rising number of viewers in Bulgaria.

BNT began its colour broadcasting in 1973 in French SECAM colour system. The second channel, BT2 saw its emergence in the following year.

Since 1975 the first video programs in the 2inch format were made. In 1977 a fond about the broadcasting and movies from the program was created. In 1983 recorders with one-inch tape were made. The end of the 2 inch era was in 1984.

The year 1991 is very important for the Bulgarian National Television. All records started to be recorded on computer and digitized for better quality that is available in a variety of other formats, as well as switch from SECAM to more widely-used PAL. BT1 and BT2, were renamed as "Kanal 1" and "Efir 2", respectively. In 1992, a gold fond about all archives was created with 2,000 photos and 33,000 information objects. The year 1999 saw the foundation of TV Bulgaria (now BNT 3), BNT's satellite television.

The 2010 FIFA World Cup became the first sports event broadcast in HD format. Since March 2012, BNT started broadcasting in 16:9 format. On 6 February 2014, BNT started broadcasting its own HD channel – BNT HD (which was renamed in 2018 as BNT 3).

Channels
The Bulgarian National Television broadcasts on four different themed channels:
 BNT 1 – a 24-hour channel with national significance
 BNT 2 – cultural-based channel that offers a variety of programmes covering all aspects of day-to-day life of the Bulgarian people, culture, arts, sports, entertainment, films, series and regional programming
 BNT 3 – sport-based channel 
 BNT 4 – broadcasts internationally and provides cultural and informative content produced in Bulgaria

Outside of Bulgaria, only BNT 4 is available to watch over the internet. However, BNT 1, BNT 2 and BNT 3 channels are watched over the internet only in Bulgaria due to their broadcasting rights. Attempting to watch BNT 1, BNT 2 and BNT 3 channels outside of Bulgaria, the test card on the website will result in the English text "This broadcast is limited only for the territory of Bulgaria.".

BNT operates four regional broadcasting centers, based in Blagoevgrad, Varna, Plovdiv and Ruse.

Mission, values and goals
BNT operates in accordance with the Radio and Television Act. Under the Act, BNT is a legal entity based in Sofia and it is the national public service broadcaster and communications operator. As a public service broadcaster, the main purpose of BNT is to deliver a broad range of news and programming that keeps its audience informed about important issues and events in the areas of politics, economics, business, culture, science and education. Through its programming policy, BNT protects national interests and values, science and education; and represents the cultural heritage of all Bulgarian citizens, irrespective of their ethnicity. BNT caters for the diverse ideas and beliefs within society by reflecting the many different points of view and encouraging mutual understanding and tolerance in the relations between people. BNT has the commitment to produce a broad spectrum of national and regional programmes including ones about other countries, societies and cultures around the world; programmes that meet the needs of Bulgarian citizens whose mother-tongue is not Bulgarian, by the inclusion of original content in their own language; and programmes that keep Bulgarians living abroad up-to date with events in their home country.

Logos

References

External links

  

Eastern Bloc mass media
Publicly funded broadcasters
Television networks in Bulgaria
European Broadcasting Union members
Television channels and stations established in 1959
1959 establishments in Bulgaria
Mass media in Sofia
State media